Sourgrass is a common name given to several plant species which have a sour taste. Most are in fact not grasses:

True grasses
 Digitaria insularis (sourgrass)
Paspalum conjugatum (carabao grass)

Other
 Oxalis species (woodsorrels) of the Oxalidaceae, namely:
 Oxalis corniculata (creeping woodsorrel)
 Oxalis pes-caprae (Bermuda-buttercup)
 Oxalis grandis (large yellow woodsorrel)
 Oxalis montana (mountain woodsorrel)
 Oxalis stricta (yellow woodsorrel)
 Rumex acetosella (sorrel) of the Polygonaceae